Constantine Falkland Cary Smythe, MC (February 1, 1895 – November 18, 1980) was a Canadian businessman, soldier and sportsman in ice hockey and horse racing. He is best known as the principal owner of the Toronto Maple Leafs of the National Hockey League (NHL) from 1927 to 1961 and as the builder of Maple Leaf Gardens. As owner of the Leafs during numerous championship years, his name appears on the Stanley Cup eight times: 1932, 1942, 1945, 1947, 1948, 1949, 1951 and 1962.

Smythe is also known for having served in both World Wars, organizing his own artillery battery in the Second World War. The horses of Smythe's racing stable won the Queen's Plate three times among 145 stakes race wins during his lifetime. Smythe started and ran a sand and gravel business.

Early years
Smythe was born on February 1, 1895, in Toronto to Albert Smythe, an Irish Protestant from County Antrim who immigrated to Canada in 1889, and Mary Adelaide Constantine, an English woman. Mary and Albert were married in the 1880s while immigrating to Canada, but their marriage was rocky and they did not live together for more than a few months at a time. Conn was the second of the couple's two children; he had a sister, Mary, five years older, who died due to illness in 1903. Smythe remembered his mother Mary, who was known as Polly, as pretty, a drinker, and troublemaker, while Albert was quiet, a vegetarian, and a devoted member of Madame Blavatsky's Theosophical movement. Albert Smythe was a charter member of the Theosophical Society of Canada in 1891, and edited its newsletter until the final years of his life.

Smythe's first home was 51 McMillan Street, now known as Mutual Street, not far from the future site of Maple Leaf Gardens.  The family was poor and moved several times during Smythe's youth, the size of lodgings depending on Albert Smythe's wages at the time. At one point, Albert and Conn moved to a house in Scarborough while Polly and Mary stayed on North Street. Mary died in 1906, and Smythe attributed his lifelong teetotalism to his mother's drinking. At age eleven, Conn was christened, the occasion marking the first time that he insisted on the name "Conn" instead of his given name, Constantine. Albert and Conn became estranged after Albert began a new relationship with Jane Henderson. The two married in 1913 and had a daughter, Moira.

Smythe first attended high school at Upper Canada College, but disliked it and transferred to Jarvis Collegiate Institute after a year and a half. He developed his athleticism there, playing on the hockey, rugby football, and basketball teams, and playing on city championship teams in basketball and hockey in 1912. At the age of 16, Smythe met Irene Sands, his future wife, after a football game against Parkdale Collegiate Institute, which she attended. After one summer building a home on the property only to have it destroyed by a devastating fire, Smythe returned home and enrolled in engineering studies at the University of Toronto in the fall of 1912. There he played hockey as a centre, captaining the Varsity Blues men's ice hockey team to the finals of the 1914 Ontario Hockey Association (OHA) junior championships and to the OHA junior championship the following year. The coach of the losing team in 1915 was Frank J. Selke, who years later would work for Smythe at Maple Leaf Gardens. Smythe also played on the University of Toronto football team, although not as a starter.

First World War

A week after winning the OHA championship in March 1915, Smythe and his eight teammates enlisted in the armed forces during World War I. He recalled in his memoirs that he and several classmates had tried to enlist at the beginning of the 1914–15 season, but were told to come back when they had beards. After securing a provisional rank of lieutenant with the 2nd (Ottawa) Battery, 8th Brigade, on July 17, he headed to the Royal School of Artillery in Kingston, Ontario, in August for five weeks of training. He made full lieutenant on September 11, and was able to get himself transferred to the 40th (Sportsmen's) Battery of Hamilton, organized by publishing figure Gordon Southam, son of William Southam. The unit, with Smythe as team manager, organized a team to compete in the OHA's senior league; they were one of four Toronto-based teams in the league in 1916. He played one game at centre, and then decided to replace himself with a better player. The team did not complete the season, as the 40th Battery went overseas in February 1916.

The Battery was ordered into the Ypres salient. On October 12, shelling found their position. killing Major Southam and Sergeant-Major Norm Harvie, temporarily making Smythe commander of the Battery. The Battery fought for nearly two months in the trenches near the Somme before being relieved. In February 1917, Smythe earned a Military Cross, when during an attack the Germans counter-attacked with grenades. Smythe ran into the fight and killed three Germans and helped several wounded Canadian soldiers back to safety On March 5, 1917, Smythe was awarded the Military Cross for "dispersing an enemy party at a critical time. Himself accounted for three of the enemy with his revolver." After an attack where several Canadians were killed because of what Smythe thought was poor planning by the Battery's Major, Smythe wanted out. Smythe transferred to the Royal Flying Corps in July 1917. One of his instructors was Billy Barker, who would later become the first president of the Toronto Maple Leafs. Smythe served as an airborne observer, directing artillery fire. Smythe was shot down by the Germans and captured on October 14, 1917; he was imprisoned by the Germans at Schweidnitz (Swidnica) in Upper Silesia. Smythe made two failed escape attempts and ended up in solitary confinement as a result. He was a POW until the end of the war. Smythe would later make light of his fourteen months in captivity "We played so damned much bridge that I never played the game again."

Return to Toronto
Following the war, Smythe returned to Toronto. With his accrued Army salary and the proceeds from the sale of his homestead plot, he started a sand and gravel business. For a while, the venture became a partnership with Frank Angotti, who owned a paving business. To support the need for sand and gravel, Smythe bought land northwest of Toronto for a sand pit. He returned to the University of Toronto and finished his civil engineering degree in 1920, marrying Irene during the school year. Smythe and his paving business partner split, and Smythe retained the sand and gravel business. The company was named C. Smythe Limited and the company slogan was "C. Smythe for sand," which he had painted on his trucks, the lettering in white on the blue of the trucks. Frank Selke, who had moved to Toronto, was one of Smythe's first employees in the business. Irene took sand and gravel orders over the phone while also caring for the couple's newborn son, Stafford. Smythe would own the business until 1961.

In the evenings, Smythe coached the University of Toronto varsity team, and it was through his coaching of this team that he became involved in the NHL. The team traveled regularly to the Boston area for games against local colleges, with great success. In 1926, Boston Bruins owner Charles Adams recommended Smythe to Col. John S. Hammond, who oversaw the new New York Rangers franchise for its owners, Madison Square Garden. Hammond hired Smythe as general manager and coach, and tasked him with putting together a team. But on October 27, 1926, before the Rangers had played a regular-season game, Hammond fired Smythe in favour of Lester Patrick. Smythe believed Hammond fired him because of his refusal to sign two-time NHL scoring champion Babe Dye, against Hammond's wishes. Smythe thought Dye was not a team player.

Smythe applied to coach the Toronto St. Pats, but was rejected in favour of Mike Rodden. He continued coaching for the University of Toronto and took on a new senior team made up of University of Toronto players, called the Varsity Grads. The team won the Allan Cup and represented Canada at the 1928 Winter Olympics in St. Moritz the following year. Smythe refused to go when two Varsity Blues players he had promised could be part of the team were blocked by what he described as a "pressure play" from two Grads players to get relatives placed on the team instead. One of the players was Joe Sullivan, who years later became a Canadian Senator.

Although Smythe was no longer a Rangers employee, Madison Square Garden president Tex Rickard invited him to the team's opening game at the arena, an invitation Smythe nearly turned down because he had felt the Rangers had short-changed him (Hammond paid Smythe $7,500 to settle his contract, but Smythe felt he was owed $10,000). At the insistence of his wife Irene, they traveled to New York and attended the opener in Rickard's private box. When the Rangers won the game, surprising the Montreal Maroons, Rickard offered Smythe a vice-presidency with the club. Smythe turned Rickard down partly because of the disputed $2,500, although Rickard ordered Hammond to pay off the rest. On their return trip to Toronto, the Smythes visited Montreal, where Conn bet the $2,500 on a university football game between Toronto and McGill. He then bet the $5,000 he won on the Rangers to defeat the St. Pats in Toronto, winning again, turning the $2,500 into $10,000 in three days. The Rangers won the Stanley Cup in 1928, their second year of existence, largely with the players Smythe had recruited.

Smythe forms the Maple Leafs
While the Rangers shot to the top of their division, Smythe's hometown team, the St. Pats, were struggling. J. P. Bickell, a part-owner of the St. Pats, contacted Smythe about coaching the team. However, Smythe told Bickell that he was more interested in buying the team, or at least a stake in the team. Bickell contacted Smythe and told him that if Smythe could raise $160,000 and keep the team in Toronto, Bickell would not sell his $40,000 interest. After persuading Querrie that civic pride was more important than money, Smythe put together a syndicate that included Bickell and several other investors that bought the St. Pats; Smythe himself invested $10,000 of his own money. Soon after the sale closed on February 14, 1927, the new owners changed the St. Pats' name to the Toronto Maple Leafs.

At first, Smythe's name was kept in the background. However, when the Leafs promoted a public share offering to raise capital, they announced that "one of the most prominent hockey coaches in Toronto" would be taking over management of the club. That prominent coach turned out to be Smythe. He succeeded Querrie as the team's governor, and installed himself as general manager. He installed Alex Romeril as coach. For the next season (1927–28), Smythe changed the team's colours from green and white to their present blue and white. According to the Maple Leafs, the blue represents the Canadian skies, while white represents snow. They were also the same colours as those of his sand and gravel business trucks. Smythe also took over as coach and for the next three years served as team governor, general manager and coach.

Smythe developed a public image as a "red-faced, pepper-pot" with nicknames such as "little corporal" or "little dictator." Smythe was not reluctant to chase players and referees on the rink and off. Smythe also developed feuds with opposing coaches and general managers. He used any tactic available to disrupt the opponent. He advertised in a Boston newspaper inviting people to watch "a real hockey team, the Toronto Maple Leafs." After learning that Boston general manager Art Ross suffered from hemorrhoids, he gave Ross a bouquet of flowers with a note in Latin describing where he should shove the flowers.

In 1929, Smythe decided, in the midst of the Great Depression, that the Maple Leafs needed a new arena. The Arena Gardens seated 8,000 people, but the Maple Leafs were regularly playing to standing room-only crowds of 9,000 customers. Smythe knew it would take over a million dollars to construct the building, and he got backing from the Sun Life insurance company for half a million. He found a site owned by the T. Eaton Co. department store chain on Carlton Street, a site he selected because it was on a streetcar line. Smythe gave up the coaching position to concentrate on the arena project. The building started construction on June 1, 1931, and was ready on November 12, 1931, after five months. As part of a corporate reorganization, Maple Leaf Gardens Ltd. was founded that year to own both the team and the arena. To pay for the building construction, the construction workers were paid with Maple Leaf Gardens stock instead of 20% of their pay. Selke (who had union connections) and Smythe were successful in negotiating the payment method in exchange for using unionized workers.

During the 1931-32 season (the Maple Leafs' first in their new arena), Smythe fired coach Art Duncan after five games and hired Dick Irvin to coach. Irvin promptly led the team to its first Stanley Cup under the Maple Leafs name, and the franchise's third overall. While the Leafs would go to the Stanley Cup Final every year during Irvin's tenure except for 1934 and 1937, they were unable to win another Cup. By 1940, Smythe believed that Irvin had taken the Leafs as far as he could, and decided to replace him with former Leafs captain Hap Day, who had retired as a player. Smythe also knew that he would be away in the war and felt that Irvin would not be tough enough without Smythe to back him up. Meanwhile, the Montreal Canadiens had had a dreadful ten-win season, and were looking for a new coach. At Smythe's suggestion, Irvin became the new coach of the Canadiens.

Thoroughbred horse racing
Smythe first became interested in horse racing as a boy, when he would take stories his father wrote at the track to the newspaper office downtown. Smythe started owning horses in the late 1920s, but he rarely had any success. One early purchase turned out to be one of his most famous. When Mrs. L. A. Livingston sold off her stable, he bought Rare Jewel, a filly, for $250. The filly regularly ran last. The horse was eligible for the Coronation Futurity Stakes, one of the best two-year-old races. Smythe was full of blind hope, and on the trainer's advice, entered her in the race. The day of the race, both the trainer and his partner gave the horse some brandy, unknown to Smythe, who bet over $100 on Rare Jewel. She won the race, a 100–1 longshot paying $214.40 on a $2 bet, besting future Queen's Plate winner Froth Blower. Between the winnings from his bets and his portion of the winner's purse as horse owner, Smythe won more than $10,000 on that one race. Three weeks later, he put his windfall to work for the Maple Leafs by purchasing star defenceman King Clancy from the depression-strapped Ottawa Senators for $35,000. The purchase was only possible because of his gambling winnings, as the other Maple Leafs owners refused to pay the Senators' then-high price, and only agreed when Smythe volunteered to use his own money.

Smythe continued to own horses through the 1930s, but he sold them in 1940, when he made plans to fight in the Second World War. He did not re-enter the racing business until 1954. In 1951, Smythe bought land for a farm in Caledon, Ontario, originally looking for a new location for a gravel pit. At first he kept only cattle, but in 1954 he decided to get back into owning race horses, in partnership with Larkin Maloney, and an area was set aside to keep horses. Smythe learned about the business and went into breeding, buying mares in foal from top thoroughbred lines, and hiring future Hall of Fame trainer Yonnie Starr.

Maloney and Smythe's most famous horse Wonder Where, also led to the breakup of the partnership. Wonder Where, named by Maloney, was bred at Frank Selke's farm in Quebec and bought by Maloney and Smythe in 1957. In 1959, Wonder Where had an outstanding season, including winning the Canadian Oaks. The horse was voted Canadian Horse of the Year for the year and later, the filly was inducted in the Canadian Horse Racing Hall of Fame. The Wonder Where Stakes was established in honour of the horse in 1965, becoming one of the Canadian Triple Tiara races for fillies in Canada in 1995. After the outstanding year in 1959, Maloney wanted to continue racing Wonder Where and Smythe did not, concerned over some tendon trouble. The horse broke down in a race in Fort Erie, and the partnership dissolved after that.

While not the largest operation, Smythe's horses won 145 stakes races during his lifetime, a record second only to E. P. Taylor in Canada. Smythe's stable won the Queen's Plate twice, the first in 1958 with Caledon Beau and the second in 1967 with Jammed Lovely. In 1973, Smythe became a founding member of the Jockey Club of Canada. In 1977, he was inducted in the Canadian Horse Racing Hall of Fame. After his death, the Smythe stable was sold in 1981 to Gardiner Farms and Harlequin Ranches, for an estimated $2.5 million. Smythe's will gave the racing stable to the Conn Smythe Foundation, which as a charitable foundation, could not run a business. The new owners leased back the farm and stables. The only horse not in the sale was Jammed Lucky, Smythe's favourite, which was given to Smythe's grandson Tommy. Jammed Lucky was 23 years old and had sired 25 winning foals to that point.

Second World War and the conscription crisis

In the Second World War, at age 45, Smythe again served in the Canadian Army. Initially, he was a captain in charge of a troop within the Canadian Officers Training Corps, based at the University of Toronto. In 1941, along with Colonel Richard Greer, he formed the 30th Battery, a sportsmen's anti-aircraft battery that was part of the 7th Toronto Regiment, RCA (Royal Canadian Artillery), Canadian Active Army. Smythe was made acting major and Officer Commanding. He was offered a higher rank to become the army's sports officer, but turned it down. After first serving on Vancouver Island to defend against Japanese attack, the Battery embarked in September 1942 to England. After being stationed in England for nearly two years, Smythe and his unit were sent to France in July 1944, where within three weeks he was badly wounded when the Germans bombed an ammunition depot. His spinal cord injury would mean that for the rest of his life he would walk with a limp and suffer bowel and urinary tract problems. He was sent back to Canada in September on a hospital ship.

Smythe, who had seen that the army was using improperly trained troops due to a lack of soldiers, interviewed other soldiers during his time in the hospital, compiling a record over which to confront Mackenzie King. King had developed an official government policy of voluntary service for political reasons and Smythe saw the detrimental effect it had on the Army. Volunteers tried to press home service troops into active service to assist and augment the undermanned troops overseas. From his bed in the Chorley Park Hospital, Smythe dictated a statement to The Globe and Mail newspaper, which printed it on its front page on September 19, 1944:

Smythe was accused of acting solely for political gain. The publisher of The Globe and Mail at the time was prominent Conservative George McCullagh, and Smythe was friends with Ontario Conservative Premier George Drew. McCullagh and Drew may have used Smythe for their political ends to defeat King. The issue of lack of reinforcements was well known within the Army and Smythe did not make any complaints to senior officers while in active service. Despite being criticized, Smythe kept up his public criticism in the newspapers. After James Ralston, Canada's defence minister, traveled to Italy, he saw for himself the shortage of skilled reinforcements. Ralston, who King did not trust, was replaced with Andrew McNaughton, who was against conscription. However, even King saw the need to send troops for the Canadian Army and he ordered 17,500 reserve troops to Europe in November 1944, which started to arrive in January 1945

Majority owner of the Maple Leafs
While Smythe was away, a committee, headed by Ed Bickle, Bill MacBrien, and Selke ran Maple Leaf Gardens Ltd., with Selke as acting general manager. Upon his return from the military, Smythe found himself in the middle of a power struggle over the presidency of the company. Smythe suspected that MacBrien, a member of the board of directors, wanted to succeed Bickle as president and make Selke general manager in his own right. Smythe wanted to be president and asked Selke for his support. Selke equivocated, and the relationship between the two long-time friends turned acrimonious, leading to Selke's resignation in May 1946. Two months later, Selke became head of hockey operations for the Canadiens and manager of their home arena, the Montreal Forum, succeeding Tommy Gorman.

With the support of J. P. Bickell and the help of a $300,000 loan from Toronto stockbroker and Gardens shareholder Percy Gardiner, Smythe bought controlling interest in Maple Leaf Gardens Ltd., and was thus able to install himself as president on November 19, 1947. However, Smythe had been the face of the franchise for more than two decades before then. Acknowledging this, Andy Lytle, sports editor of the Toronto Star, said the appointment "simply makes official what he has been for years in actuality ... Smythe and the Gardens are synonymous terms." MacBrien was made chairman. Smythe repaid his debt to Gardiner by 1960. He later succeeded MacBrien as chairman of the board.

Smythe oversaw one of hockey's greatest dynasties when Toronto won six Stanley Cups in 10 seasons between 1942 and 1951. Hap Day coached the team to five of those Cups and was assistant general manager for the sixth. He was named in a poll of Canadian sports editors the "most dominating personality in any capacity in sports" for 1949. The Maple Leafs were masters of playoff hockey; their regular-season performances were usually fair to good or just good enough to make the playoffs. Smythe was known for caring little about gaudy regular-season records. However, he did care about winning the Cup, because "winning sells tickets."

However, the Leafs spent most of the 1950s as a mediocre team, struggling under three different coaches while Day remained assistant general manager under Smythe. Even so, in 1955, Smythe turned over most responsibility for hockey operations to Day, but nominally remained general manager. However, just after the Leafs were eliminated from the playoffs in 1957, Smythe told the media that it had been "a season of failure" and that he did not know if the 55-year-old Day would be available for the next season. Day felt Smythe had cut his legs out from under him and resigned; he had spent 28 of the previous 30 years with the St. Pats/Leafs as a player, coach, or executive.

By this time Smythe had turned team operations over to a seven-person committee, headed by his son Stafford. Newspaper owner John Bassett was another member of the committee, as was Percy Gardiner's son, George. The committee became known as the "Silver Seven" because the seven had been "born with a silver spoon in their mouths." Initially, all members were in their 30s or early 40s, but that changed before the end of the year when 54-year-old Harold Ballard, president of the Toronto Marlboros, was appointed to the committee to fill a vacancy. The committee hired Punch Imlach as general manager; Imlach would later take over the coaching job as well.

Smythe was an NHL owner during the era before the advent of a players' union. Between the 1942–43 and 1966-67 seasons, the NHL consisted of only six teams (the Original Six), and players who failed to comply with team orders could easily be demoted to the minor leagues and replaced. Players who did not follow Smythe's rules were traded or sent to the minors. Two players, Danny Lewicki and John McCormack, were both demoted to the minors for getting married without Smythe's permission.

While the pay for an NHL player was relatively good, it still left many players looking for other jobs during the off-season, while the owners were all wealthy men. These conditions led to two efforts to organize a union, which Smythe was vehemently against. From 1957 onwards, Smythe, along with other owners, including James D. Norris of the Chicago Black Hawks and his half-brother Bruce Norris of the Detroit Red Wings, were accused of union busting activities related to Ted Lindsay's attempt to form an NHL Players Association. Smythe's role in those affairs are dramatized in the movie Net Worth. Jimmy Thomson, who was acting captain of the Maple Leafs when the players started to organize, was singled out by Smythe. Smythe detailed all the monies Thomson had been paid by the organization going back to junior, while arranging for Thomson to be left off the team. He also allegedly called Thomson a traitor and publicly blamed him for the team's poor season. Thomson finally announced to the press that he would never play again for the Maple Leafs, and he and Tod Sloan were traded away to Chicago. The NHL owners eventually agreed to make some concessions to the players, such as contributing to the players' pensions. The owners were able to temporarily head off the formation of the union, although it would eventually be organized some ten years later.

Later years
Though the Silver Seven made most decisions involving the Leafs, Smythe was not a hands-off owner and was constantly fighting with his son. Stafford commented: "My father has always given me lots of rope. When I was thirty, I was ten years ahead of everybody. But at forty, I'm ten years behind everybody." Finally, in 1961, Stafford resigned from the committee and this spurred Conn. After four years of fighting, he offered to sell his shares to Stafford and in November 1961, Smythe sold 45,000 of his 50,000 shares in Maple Leaf Gardens Ltd. to a partnership of his son, Ballard, and Bassett for $2.3 million—a handsome return on his investment of 34 years earlier. Years later, Smythe claimed that he thought the sale was only to Stafford, and was furious to learn that he'd brought on Ballard and Bassett as partners. According to this account, Smythe had hoped that Stafford would eventually keep the Gardens for his son Tommy. However, it is not likely that Stafford would have been able to raise the money on his own.

As part of the arrangement, Smythe resigned as president and managing director, nominating Stafford to succeed him. At Stafford's instigation, the board then granted Smythe a $15,000 annual allowance, an office at the Gardens, and a car and driver for the rest of his life. Stafford, Ballard, and Bassett then nominated Smythe as chairman of the board. Smythe stood down as governor of the Leafs on February 5, 1962–a position he had held since 1927. Smythe resigned the team chairmanship after Toronto won the Stanley Cup in 1962, and Bassett succeeded him.

In 1964, Smythe opposed the plan of Liberal Prime Minister Lester B. Pearson to replace the traditional Canadian flag with a completely new design. He wrote to Pearson, whom he had known since the 1920s: "In the Olympic Games, the whole world is represented and when Canada sometimes wins a Gold Medal everybody knows, when the Red Ensign is raised to the masthead, that Canada has won." Smythe disagreed that a new flag would help to unify the country, and switched his support to John Diefenbaker and the Progressive Conservatives. Smythe wrote over 300 letters to Members of Parliament. In 1965, he unsuccessfully lobbied for the Red Ensign to be flown at the Gardens instead of the new Flag of Canada. Ballard ordered the new flag flown because calls were more than three to one in favour of the new flag.

In March 1966, Smythe sold his remaining shares in Maple Leaf Gardens Ltd. and resigned from the board of directors after a Muhammad Ali boxing match was scheduled for the Gardens. He found Ali's refusal to serve in the U.S. Army during the Vietnam War to be offensive because, as he put it in his autobiography, "The Gardens was founded by men – sportsmen – who fought for their country. It is no place for those want to evade conscription in their own country. The Gardens was built for many things, but not for picking up things that no one else wants." He also said that by accepting the fight, Gardens owners had "put cash ahead of class."

Smythe stayed away from the Gardens and took shots at the ownership in the press, stating that he had been "traded for $35,000 and a black Muslim minister." The seats at the Gardens had been replaced with new, narrower ones, and Smythe commented that "only a slim, young man could sit in them but the prices are so high that only a fat rich man could afford them." He continued to be sought out for his views on hockey. When the NHL expanded to 12 teams from six in 1967, Smythe openly opposed the expansion on the basis that it would make for inferior hockey: "We had the best players in the world split between six teams, and hockey was always worth the money."

By this time, Conn and Stafford were not on speaking terms, and it fell to Tom Smythe, Stafford's son, to mediate between the two. Stafford built a new office suite at the Gardens for Conn, and the feud was over. After Stafford was charged with fraud in 1971 and became ill with a stomach ulcer, Conn was with him in hospital when he died. According to Conn, Stafford's last words to him were "see dad, I told you they wouldn't put me in jail."

Other accomplishments and honours

After the Second World War, Smythe became involved in charities and would remain so for the rest of his life. 

Always mindful of the well-being of his fellow veterans, he helped establish and was a founding director of the Canadian Paraplegic Association in 1945 (the foreparent of Spinal Cord Injury Ontario and other spinal cord injury organizations). He gave generously of his time, expertise and treasure to aid in the organization's success, even housing its offices and storing its incoming batches of wheelchairs for his fellow veterans, at Maple Leaf Gardens.

He became heavily involved in the Ontario Society for Crippled Children. Smythe helped organize the financing and construction of their Variety Club Village complex in Toronto. In 1975, at the age of 80, Smythe organized the financing and building of the Ontario Community Centre for the Deaf, which opened in 1979.

In 1960, after paying off his debt to Percy Gardiner, Smythe set up the Conn Smythe Charitable Foundation, which distributes money to charities in the Toronto area. The foundation was operated by Conn, his children and Hap Day. Day continued to help with the Foundation until his death in 1990. Before he died, Conn arranged for his grandson Thomas Smythe to continue the Foundation after his death.

Smythe supervised the construction of the Hockey Hall of Fame building in Toronto in 1961. He served as the Hall's chairman for several years, but resigned in June 1971 when Busher Jackson was posthumously elected into the Hall. Smythe said that it made him sick to think of Jackson alongside such Leafs as "Apps, Primeau, Conacher, Clancy and Kennedy. If the standards are going to be lowered I'll get out as chairman of the board." Jackson was notorious for his off-ice lifestyle of drinking and broken marriages. Frank Selke, head of the selection committee, defended the selection on the belief that a man should not be shut out "because of the amount of beer he drank."

The National Hockey League honoured Smythe's contribution to the game by introducing the Conn Smythe Trophy in 1965, to be presented to the Most Valuable Player in the Stanley Cup playoffs. After his death, the trophy was renamed the Conn Smythe Memorial Trophy. The league also named one of its four divisions, the Smythe Division, after him prior to the 1974–75 season. The division existed until league expansion and realignment after the 1992-93 season.

Smythe Park and Recreation Centre in Toronto is located on the site of his old gravel pit. The surrounding neighbourhood is named Rockcliffe-Smythe, partly a sub-division Smythe built for war veterans. Smythe made provisions for a portion of the lands of the sub-division to be reserved for the centre. A street north of Eglinton Avenue, west of Markham Avenue, is named Conn Smythe Drive in his honour.

His autobiography, Conn Smythe: If You Can't Beat 'Em in the Alley, written with Scott Young, was published posthumously in 1981. The title was taken from Smythe's credo, "If you can't beat 'em in the alley, you can't beat 'em on the ice." In Smythe's memoir he describes it as the most misunderstood remark he ever made. Rather than meaning that his players should go out and bully the opposition, he meant the opposite; that his players should refuse to be bullied by the opposition.

Conn Smythe was inducted into the Ontario Sports Hall of Fame in 1998.

Family and personal life
Smythe married Irene Sands on March 17, 1920, at Central Methodist Church. The couple lived in an apartment on St. Clair Avenue, then moved to the Runnymede area of Toronto to be close to Smythe's sand and gravel business, which operated a gravel pit north-west of Jane Street and St. Clair. (Smythe Park exists on the site today). In 1927, after their first two children, Stafford and Miriam, were born, they moved to the Baby Point enclave of Toronto, where they would live for the rest of their lives. Irene and Smythe had two other children, Hugh and Patricia. Hugh became a doctor; a specialist in rheumatology, and later a director of Maple Leaf Gardens. Patricia died due to an allergic attack at the age of ten, in 1945. Stafford became involved in the Smythe sand and gravel business and Maple Leaf Gardens before dying of complications from a bleeding ulcer in 1971. Stafford's son Thomas was a stick boy with the Maple Leafs and later was involved with the Toronto Marlboros and Doug Laurie Sporting Goods at Maple Leaf Gardens, before becoming director of the Smythe Charitable Foundation after Conn's death.

Smythe's father died in 1947 at 86 years of age. Smythe had had a rapprochement with his father, seeing him at Christmas and at times when Albert came to Toronto to preach. After his father's death, Smythe joined the Theosophical Society and remained a member for life. In 1977, Smythe explained why he was a theosophist: "It's because a theosophist teaches you that ya can't get away with anything in this life anyway."

Irene Smythe was diagnosed with cancer after Christmas 1963. The illness progressed and Irene died on June 20, 1965. Due to the amount of pain Irene endured, Conn and Irene considered using a revolver to end her life, but near the end she told Conn that it was a "coward's way out" and she endured. After the amount of pain Irene endured, Smythe called her death a "blessed release." Smythe set up a foundation at the University of Toronto in her name, which opened the Irene Eleanor Smythe Pain Clinic at Toronto General Hospital.

On April 20, 1978, Smythe suffered a heart attack. He spent a month in the hospital, in time to spend May 18 at Woodbine, where he had four horses racing that day. His health continued to deteriorate and Conn realized that he was dying. He arranged for his grandson Thomas Smythe to take over the Conn Smythe Foundation, and he made gifts of money to relatives. Conn Smythe died at the age of 85 in 1980 at his home on Baby Point. He is interred with Irene at Park Lawn Cemetery in Toronto.

Coaching record

Source:

See also 
 List of family relations in the NHL

References

Bibliography

External links
 
 Conn Smythe fonds, Archives of Ontario

 

1895 births
1980 deaths
Military personnel from Toronto
Canada men's national ice hockey team coaches
Canadian Horse Racing Hall of Fame inductees
Canadian ice hockey centres
Canadian ice hockey coaches
Canadian ice hockey owners
Canadian military personnel of World War I
Canadian Army personnel of World War II
Canadian people of English descent
Canadian people of Northern Ireland descent
Canadian prisoners of war in World War I
Canadian racehorse owners and breeders
Hockey Hall of Fame inductees
Maple Leaf Sports & Entertainment
National Hockey League executives
National Hockey League owners
New York Rangers executives
Canadian recipients of the Military Cross
Royal Flying Corps officers
Sovereign Award winners
Ice hockey people from Toronto
Stanley Cup champions
Canadian Expeditionary Force officers
Toronto Maple Leafs coaches
Toronto Maple Leafs executives
University of Toronto alumni
Royal Regiment of Canadian Artillery officers
World War I prisoners of war held by Germany
Owners of King's Plate winners